Kyle Maxwell (born December 1, 1990 in Bridgetown) is a Barbadian judoka. He competed in the men's 73 kg event at the 2012 Summer Olympics and was eliminated in the second round by Riki Nakaya.  At the 2014 Commonwealth Games, he was defeated in the last-32 by Ashaan Nelson.  He won bronze at the 2011 Caribbean Championships.

References

1990 births
Living people
Sportspeople from Bridgetown
Barbadian male judoka
Olympic judoka of Barbados
Judoka at the 2012 Summer Olympics
Judoka at the 2014 Commonwealth Games
Commonwealth Games competitors for Barbados